Hondalagus is an extinct genus of marsupial mammals that lived during the Middle Miocene epoch (Laventan) in South America. Their fossils were found in the Honda Group at Quebrada Honda, in southern Bolivia. Hondalagus represents the smallest and most specialized member of the extinct family Argyrolagidae.

References 

Miocene marsupials
Miocene mammals of South America
Laventan
Neogene Bolivia
Fossils of Bolivia
Fossil taxa described in 1988